Valikestan (also Romanized as Valīkestān) is a village in Langarud Rural District, Salman Shahr District, Abbasabad County, Mazandaran Province, Iran. At the 2006 census, its population was 519, in 128 families.

References 

Populated places in Abbasabad County